The 2007–08 Toto Cup Artzit was the 9th time the cup was being contested. The final was played at Sar-Tov Stadium (HaKufsa) in Netanya on 11 December 2007.

The winners were Maccabi Ironi Kiryat Ata, beating Beitar Shimshon Tel Aviv 3–0 in the final.

Group stage

Group A

Group B

Semifinals

Final

See also
 Toto Cup
 2007–08 Liga Artzit
 2007–08 in Israeli football

External links
 Toto Cup Artzit 2007/2008 IFA 

Toto Cup Artzit
Toto Cup Artzit
Israel Toto Cup Artzit